Sarosa boenninghauseni is a moth in the subfamily Arctiinae. It was described by Rothschild in 1911. It is found in Brazil (Rio de Janeiro).

References

Natural History Museum Lepidoptera generic names catalog

Moths described in 1911
Arctiinae